Edel Signe Randem (married name: Uvland; born 11 September 1910 in Oslo – died 26 November 2001 in Stabekk) was a Norwegian figure skater. 

She competed at the 1931 World Figure Skating Championships, where she finished sixth. She also finished sixth at the 1930 European Figure Skating Championships, and she participated at the 1928 Winter Olympics, where she finished 13th.

Randem won the Norwegian Figure Skating Championships in 1930 and 1931.

Results

References

External links
 

1910 births
2001 deaths
Norwegian female single skaters
Olympic figure skaters of Norway
Figure skaters at the 1928 Winter Olympics
Sportspeople from Oslo
20th-century Norwegian women